Sergei Vladimirovich Brylin (born January 13, 1974) is a Russian former professional ice hockey centre, currently an assistant coach with the New Jersey Devils of the National Hockey League (NHL). Brylin is a three-time Stanley Cup champion with the New Jersey Devils of the National Hockey League (NHL).

Playing career

Brylin made his NHL debut on February 17, 1995, and scored his first NHL goal on February 27. A versatile, defensive forward capable of playing all three forward positions, Brylin won three Stanley Cups with the New Jersey Devils in 1995, 2000 and 2003. He is one of five Devils who have played for all three of their championship teams, the only others being Martin Brodeur, Scott Niedermayer, Scott Stevens and Ken Daneyko.

On July 1, 2008, the Devils turned down the option to have Brylin return for another year. Ten days later, he signed with SKA Saint Petersburg of the Kontinental Hockey League (KHL).

After hopes of returning to the Devils for one more season faded, Brylin signed with Metallurg Novokuznetsk for the 2011–12 KHL season.

Coaching career
Brylin was an assistant coach for the Utica Comets, the American Hockey League (AHL) affiliate of the New Jersey Devils. He is also a coach at Proskate in New Jersey. In 2022, he was named assistant coach for the New Jersey Devils.

Personal and family life
Brylin currently lives in Short Hills, New Jersey, with his wife, Elena, and three children: Anna, Fyodor and Maria.

Career statistics

Regular season and playoffs

International

See also
 List of NHL players who spent their entire career with one franchise

References

External links
 

1974 births
Albany River Rats players
HC CSKA Moscow players
HC Khimik Voskresensk players
Living people
Metallurg Novokuznetsk players
New Jersey Devils draft picks
New Jersey Devils players
Russian ice hockey centres
Russian Penguins players
SKA Saint Petersburg players
Ice hockey people from Moscow
Stanley Cup champions
People from Millburn, New Jersey